Mihăileni ( or colloquially Szentmihály, Hungarian pronunciation: , meaning "St. Michael of Csík") is a commune in Harghita County, Romania. The commune lies in the Székely Land, an ethno-cultural region in eastern Transylvania.

Component villages 
The commune is composed of four villages:

Location 
The centre village is situated in Upper Ciuc along the no. 124 county road. Its inner area is crossed by the Racu (Rákos) Stream. The village was formed at the meeting point of this stream and the Csorgó Stream springing from the Kőd Mountain. The Kőd Peak (845 m) rises to the northeast, the Kőcsonka Peak (886 m) to the north; the Frumoasa Stream crosses the border in the south.  In the west it is bordered by the Pagan Mountain (1,195 m), Kőnyak and the Livezi Peak. Several mineral water springs can be found here.

History

Its name was first recorded in 1333 when a ’sacerdos de Sancto Michaele’ was mentioned in a papal tithe register. In 1539, it was mentioned as Zent Mijhal, in 1684 as Csik Szent Mihály. Its Hungarian name received its current form in 1913. Until, 1919, its Romanian names was Sânmihaiu, then it was changed to Cic-Sânmihaiu, and finally the current official name.
The village suffered a lot in 1694 on occasion of the Tartar invasion, it was then that the neighboring village called Cibrefalva was completely devastated.

The component villages were historically part of the Székely Land area of Transylvania and belonged to Csíkszék district until the administrative reform of Transylvania in 1876, when they fell within Csík County in the Kingdom of Hungary. After the Treaty of Trianon of 1920, they became part of Romania and fell within Ciuc County during the interwar period. In 1940, the second Vienna Award granted the Northern Transylvania to Hungary and they were held by Hungary until 1944. After Soviet occupation, the Romanian administration returned and the town became officially part of Romania in 1947. Between 1952 and 1960, the commune fell within the Magyar Autonomous Region, between 1960 and 1968 the Mureș-Magyar Autonomous Region. In 1968, the province was abolished, and since then, the commune has been part of Harghita County.

Demographics
The commune has an absolute Hungarian (Székely) majority. According to the 2011 census it has a population of 2,632 of which 79.9% or 2,103 are Hungarian, while 517 (19.64%) are Romanians. The village of Livezi has an ethnic Romanian majority.

Landmarks 
The ruins of the Balaskó Castle are to be found on the Vártető, 6 km to the east of the village.
 Its Roman Catholic fortified church was built between 1457 and 1467. It was set on fire  by the Ottoman Turkish troops in 1661, then  by the Tartar troops in 1694. The present church tower was built by Mihály Sándor in memory of his liberation from the Turkish captivity. The church was altered and expanded in 1819. In 1930, wall paintings from the 15th century were found. The wooden sculpture of St. Michael which used to stand on its altar, is now exhibited in the Museum of Miercurea-Ciuc. It was thought to be from the time when Székely people were converted to Christianity.
 The Biális-mansion was built in 1837 in a style characteristic for the mansions used by the Székely nobility,
The Karakó-railway viaduct is 226 meter long and 64 m high and is the longest of its kind in Transylvania. It was built in 1896 by the Hungarian State Railways (MÁV). The bridge was blown up both in World War I and World War II and it was finally rebuilt by the Romanian Railways Company (CFR) in 1946.

Sports 
It has a football club called Străduința Mihăileni (in Hungarian: Csíkszentmihályi Törekvés). Established in 1998, it has been playing in the Harghita district league since that time.

Twinnings 
The village is twinned with:
 Enese, Hungary
 Gabčíkovo, Slovakia
 St.Stefan, Austria
 Káva, Hungary
 Taksony, Hungary

See also 
List of Székely settlements

References

External links 
Pictures of the Roman Catholic Parish Church 
Roman Catholic Parish Information 
Tourist Information 
SZAVISZ - Local Youth Association 

Communes in Harghita County
Localities in Transylvania
Székely communities